Santipur B.Ed College, established in 2010, is a private college in Santipur, Nadia district, West Bengal, India. This institution provides a bachelor's degree-level course on teacher education. The duration of this course is one academic year and the proposed intake is 100 students. It is approved by the National Council for Teacher Education (NCTE). It is affiliated with the University of Kalyani.

Mission
To produce well trained would-be teachers.

Description

Santipur B.Ed college was established on 6 August 2010. A Primary Teachers Training Institute and a pre-primary Montessori school are also located inside the boundary of this college.

Methods

Science
Mathematics
Physical Science
Life Science
Computer Education (Elective)

Arts
Bengali
English
Sanskrit
History
Geography
Political Science
Art Education
Hindi
Education

References

External links
Santipur B.Ed College
Santipur D.Ed College (P.T.T.I)
Kidzee (Montessori school)l

Colleges of education in India
Universities and colleges in Nadia district
Colleges affiliated to University of Kalyani
Shantipur
Educational institutions established in 2010
2010 establishments in West Bengal